St. Mary's Episcopal Church is an Anglo-Catholic Episcopal parish in Asheville, North Carolina in the Episcopal Diocese of Western North Carolina

Its historic redbrick Gothic Revival church was designed by Richard Sharp Smith and Chauncey Beadle and built in 1914.

It was listed on the U.S. National Register of Historic Places in 1994. It is located in the Proximity Park Historic District.

References

External links

St Mary's Church, Asheville

Churches completed in 1914
20th-century Episcopal church buildings
Churches in Asheville, North Carolina
Churches on the National Register of Historic Places in North Carolina
Episcopal church buildings in North Carolina
Anglo-Catholic church buildings in the United States
National Register of Historic Places in Buncombe County, North Carolina
Historic district contributing properties in North Carolina